Zibangolola is a village and seat of the commune of Tiankadi in the Cercle of Sikasso in the Sikasso Region of southern Mali.

References

Populated places in Sikasso Region